Henri Jean Colson (21 April 1819 – 30 April 1900) was a Belgian engineer, industrialist, professor at the University of Ghent, alderman and burgomaster of Ghent (Belgium) (ad interim)

Sources
 Devolder, K., Gij die door 't volk gekozen zijt ... De Gentse gemeenteraad en haar leden 1830–1914, in : Verhandelingen der Maatschappij voor Geschiedenis en Oudheidkunde te Gent, 1994, p. 264-265.
 Henri Colson (Liberaal Archief)

See also
 List of mayors of Ghent

1819 births
1900 deaths
Businesspeople from Ghent
Politicians from Ghent
Engineers from Ghent